Wayland may refer to two municipalities in Steuben County, New York in the United States:

Wayland (town), New York
Wayland (village), New York, located entirely within the town